Giovanni Battista Colomba (born 1638) was an Italian painter and architect of the Baroque period. He was born in Arogno in the Ticino, and was active there including in the monastery of San Floriano. He died poor in the service of the King of Poland. He was the uncle of Giovanni Battista Innocenzo Colombo.

Sources

External links 
 

17th-century Italian painters
Italian male painters
Baroque painters
1638 births
People from the Province of Como
Year of death unknown